Apiactis is a genus of cnidarians belonging to the family Cerianthidae.

Species:

Apiactis bengalensis 
Apiactis denticulata 
Apiactis tentaculata

References

Cerianthidae
Anthozoa genera